Pacemaker is a 2012 South Korean sports drama film. This was director Kim Dal-joong's feature film debut; he had previously directed stage musicals. Pacemaker received three nominations at the 49th Grand Bell Awards (Best Actor, Best New Director, and Best New Actress).

Plot

Joo Man-ho, a boy from an impoverished family, has a talent for long-distance running but always finishes second place in a race — on purpose, in order to win the box of instant noodles given to runners-up. He grows up to become a national marathoner, but because of an injury, he never becomes a premier athlete and instead hold himself back as he did in his childhood. He is relegated to the role of "pacemaker" – someone who runs alongside the star athletes for three-quarters of the marathon (30 of 42.195 kilometers), making sure they stay on winning pace, but then letting them finish the race alone. Later in life, a cold-hearted marathon coach scouts Joo to run again, this time pacing for Korea's star marathoner at the 2012 London Olympics. This creates an opportunity for Joo to complete his lifetime goal of actually running a full Olympic marathon, but he must first summon the courage and drive to fulfill his dream and run for himself and no one else.

Cast
Kim Myung-min as Joo Man-ho
Ahn Sung-ki as Coach Park Seong-il
Go Ara as Yoo Ji-won
Choi Tae-joon as Min Yoon-ki
Jo Hee-bong as Jong-soo
Choi Jae-woong as Joo Seong-ho
Jung Joon-won as Young Seong-ho
Lee Yul as Kyeong-soon 
Abu Dod as Bongjo 
Park Seong-taek as Pole vault coach 
Yoon Min as Woo-jin 
Gye Seong-yong as Coach Lee 
Choi Na-rae as Jong-soo's wife
Lee El as Choi Min-kyeong 
Lee Yoo-ha as Seong-ho's wife
Jo Young-jin as Track and Field federation director 
Kwak Jin-seok as Uyuki 
Im Jong-yoon as Nike director
Han Seong-sik as Coach Han, London Olympics marathon commentator

References

External links
 
 

2012 films
South Korean sports drama films
2010s sports drama films
2012 drama films
2010s South Korean films
2010s Korean-language films